Mehra is a surname found in India and Iran. Also Mehra is a Parsi Girls name, the meaning of the name is "Affectionate, Kind" from Persian origin. This name is mainly used in Parsi. As per Indian Hindu and Sikhism, this name is suggested for Who born with star Magha Nakshatra 4th pada, Simha rasi (Leo)..[1] This surname derives from the word Mihir, meaning sun, [2] or master.[1] (21.  

According to Aditya Malik, Mehra of Uttarakhand are community of Rajput landowners in Kumaon Division of Central Himalayas.

Variations 

Later modifications of this surname are Mehrotra and Malhotra. Malhotra is Punjabi language, version of Mehrotra.

Notable persons
Notable people with the surname, who may or may not be affiliated with Rajputs or Khatris, include:
 Amod Mehra, Indian trade analyst and film journalist
 Arti Mehra, Mayor of Municipal Corporation of Delhi from 2007 to 2009
 Benita Mehra, British engineer
 Bhanu Sri Mehra (born 1986), Indian film actress in Telugu, Tamil and Punjabi films
 Brij Bhushan Mehra (died 1991), Indian Punjabi politician
 Divya Mehra (born 1981), Canadian artist
 Gulshan Mehra (1937–1986), Indian cricketer
 Hiten Mehra (born 1997), Indian cricketer
 Jagdish Mehra (1931–2008), Indian-American science historian
 Jankidas Mehra (1910–2003), Indian Hindi actor
 Karan Mehra (born 1982), Indian television actor, model and fashion designer
 Karan Veer Mehra, Indian television actor
 Madan Mehra (born 1934), Indian cricketer
 Mandeep R. Mehra (born 1964), Indian-American cardiologist
 Narinder Kumar Mehra (born 1949), Indian immunologist
 Neelam Mehra, Indian actress
 Nitya Mehra, Indian Bollywood film director and screenwriter
 Om Prakash Mehra (1919–2015), Chief of the Air Staff of the Indian Air Force from 1973 to 1976
 Prakash Mehra (1939–2009), Indian film director and producer of Hindi films
 Puneet Mehra (born 1988), Indian cricketer
 Raj Mehra, character actor in Bollywood films
 Raj Kumar Mehra (1918–2001), Indian cyclist
 Rajan Mehra (1933–2010), Indian cricket umpire
 Rajnish Mehra (born 1950), Indian-American economist
 Ramprakash Mehra (1917–1983), Indian cricketer and cricket administrator
 Rakeysh Omprakash Mehra, Indian filmmaker and screenwriter
 Ribbhu Mehra, Indian television actor, model and DJ
 Rohan Mehra (born 1990), Indian actor and model
 Rooma Mehra (born 1967), Indian poet, painter, sculptor, newspaper writer and columnist
 Shiela Mehra, Indian gynaecologist and obstetrician
 Smriti Mehra (born 1972), Indian golfer
 Soniya Mehra (born 1988), Indian Bollywood actress
 Surinder Mehra (1932–2003), Chief of Air Staff of Indian Air Force from 1988 to 1991
 Umesh Mehra, Indian director and producer of Bollywood films
 Vinod Mehra (1945–1990), Indian actor in Bollywood films
Kunal Sanjay Mehra, Indian singer and music composer in jodhpur (Rajasthan)

References

Indian surnames
Surnames of Indian origin
Punjabi-language surnames
Surnames of Hindustani origin
Hindu surnames
Khatri clans
Khatri surnames